The British actor David Niven (1910–1983) performed in many genres of light entertainment, including film, radio and theatre. He was also the author of four books: two works of fiction and two autobiographies. Described by Brian McFarlane, writing for the British Film Institute (BFI), as being "of famously debonair manner", Niven's career spanned from 1932 until 1983.

After brief spells as an army officer, whisky salesman and with a horse racing syndicate, he was an uncredited extra in his screen debut in There Goes the Bride; he went on to appear in nearly a hundred films, the last of which was in 1983: Curse of the Pink Panther. During his long film career, he was presented with a Golden Globe Award for his part in The Moon Is Blue (1953) and was nominated for a BAFTA for the titular lead in Carrington V.C. (1955). For his role as Major Pollock in the 1958 film Separate Tables, Niven was awarded the Academy and Golden Globe awards for a performance where "the pain behind the fake polish was moving to observe". According to Sheridan Morley, Niven's other notable works include The Charge of the Light Brigade (1938), The Way Ahead (1944), A Matter of Life and Death (1946)—judged by the BFI to be one of the top twenty British films of all time—The Guns of Navarone (1961) and the role of Sir Charles Litton in three Pink Panther films.

Niven lived much of his life in the United States, although upon the outbreak of the Second World War, he returned to Britain to fight, and was re-commissioned as a lieutenant in the Highland Light Infantry. At the end of the war he returned to the US and continued his film work, but increasingly appeared on American radio and television channels, and later on their British counterparts. In the latter medium he appeared frequently in the Four Star Playhouse series, as well as producing some editions. For his roles in both television and on film, Niven was honoured with two stars on the Hollywood Walk of Fame. He died in 1983 from a virulent form of motor neurone disease at the age of 73.

Filmography

 This list also includes film specific awards and nominations won by Niven, but not the career awards, which consisted of:
 the 1959 Louella O. Parsons' Golden Apple Award for Most Cooperative Male Star; 
 the Alexander Walker Special Award, won at the 1980 Evening Standard British Film Awards.

Stage credits

Radio broadcasts

{| class="wikitable plainrowheaders sortable" style="margin-right: 0;"
|+ Radio broadcasts of David Niven
|-
! scope="col" | Broadcast
! scope="col" | Date
! scope="col" | Channel
! scope="col" class="unsortable" | Notes
|-
! scope="row" | Shell Chateau
| 
| NBC
|
|-
! scope="row" | Lux Radio Theatre: "The Gilded Lily"
| 
| NBC
|
|-
! scope="row" | In the British Army
| 
| NBC
|
|-
! scope="row" | 
| 
| NBC
|
|-
! scope="row" | 
| 
| NBC
|
|-
! scope="row" | Radio Tribute to the King and Queen of England
| 
| 
|
|-
! scope="row" | 
| 
| NBC
|
|-
! scope="row" | Silver Theater: "Ex Spy"
| 
| NBC
|
|-
! scope="row" | 
| 
| ABC Radio
|
|-
! scope="row" | Bob Hope Entertains the Troops
| 
| 
|
|-
! scope="row" | Sealtest Variety Theater
| 
| NBC
|
|-
! scope="row" | Information Please
| 
| NBC
|
|-
! scope="row" | 
| 
| ABC Radio
|
|-
! scope="row" | Lux Radio Theatre: "Frenchman's Creek"
| 
| CBS
|
|-
! scope="row" | This is Hollywood
| 
| CBS
|
|-
! scope="row" | Hi Jinx!
| 
| NBC
|
|-
! scope="row" | Hollywood Hotel
| 
| ABC Radio
|
|-
! scope="row" | Kraft Music Hall
| 
| NBC
|
|-
! scope="row" | Hollywood Star Preview
| 
| 
|
|-
! scope="row" | Mary Margaret McBride Program
| 
| NBC
|
|-
! scope="row" | : "Berkeley Square"
| 
| CBS
|
|-
! scope="row" | Screen Guild Players: "Enchantment"
| 
| CBS
| As General Sir Roland Dane in adaptation of Enchantment
|-
! scope="row" | Screen Guild Players: "Stairway to Heaven"
| 
| CBS
| As Peter Carter in adaptation of A Matter of Life and Death
|-
! scope="row" | NBC University Theatre: "Nineteen Eighty-Four"
| 
| NBC
| As Winston Smith in adaptation of Nineteen Eighty-Four
|-
! scope="row" | Anacin Hollywood Start Theater: "Next Door to Yesterday| 
| 
|
|-
! scope="row" | Hollywood Watch| 
| 
|
|-
! scope="row" | Camel Screen Guild Theater: "A Kiss in the Dark"
| 
| CBS
| As Eric Phillips in adaptation of A Kiss in the Dark|-
! scope="row" | Theater Guild on the Air: "Brief Encounter"
| 
| CBS
|
|-
! scope="row" | Lux Radio Theatre: "The Bishop's Wife"
| 
| CBS
| As Henry Brougham in adaptation of The Bishop's Wife|-
! scope="row" | Theater Guild on the Air: "I Know Where I'm Going"
| 
| CBS
|
|-
! scope="row" | 
| 
| ABC Radio
|
|-
! scope="row" | Theater Guild on the Air: "This Woman Business"
| 
| CBS
|
|-
! scope="row" | Philip Morris Playhouse on Broadway: "Brief Encounter"
| 
| 
|
|-
! scope="row" | Theater Guild on the Air: "The Thief"
| 
| CBS
|
|-
! scope="row" | : "Bluebeard's Eighth Wife"
| 
| CBS
| 
|-
! scope="row" | Hallmark Playhouse: "Lorna Doone"
| 
| 
|
|-
! scope="row" | Theater Guild on the Air: "Dear Brutus"
| 
| CBS
| 
|-
! scope="row" | 
| 
| CBS
|
|-
! scope="row" | Hollywood Star Theater| 
| 
|
|-
! scope="row" | Hollywood Star Theater: "The Long Shot"
| 
| 
|
|-
! scope="row" | 
| 
| NBC
|
|-
! scope="row" | 
| 
| NBC
|
|-
! scope="row" | 
| 
| NBC
|
|-
! scope="row" | 
| 
| NBC
|
|-
! scope="row" | Lux Radio Theatre: "Stairway to Heaven"
| 
| CBS
| As Peter Carter in adaptation of A Matter of Life and Death|-
! scope="row" | Please Don't Eat the Daisies| 
| 
|
|-
! scope="row" | Weekend Woman's Hour| 
| BBC Radio 4
|
|-
! scope="row" | Kaleidoscope| 
| BBC Radio 4
|
|-
! scope="row" | David Niven| 
| BBC Radio 4
|
|-
! scope="row" | 
| 
| BBC Radio 2
|
|-
! scope="row" | Noël: The Life and Times of Noël Coward| 
| BBC Radio 4
|
|-
! scope="row" | 
| 
| BBC Radio 2
|
|-
! scope="row" | 
| 
| BBC Radio 2
|
|-
! scope="row" | David Niven| 
| BBC Radio 2
|
|-
! scope="row" | Kaleidoscope| 
| BBC Radio 4
|
|-
! scope="row" | Desert Island Discs| 
| BBC Radio 4
|
|-
! scope="row" | John Dunn Show| 
| BBC Radio 2
|
|}

Television

 This list also includes programme-specific nominations for Niven, but not the career nominations, which consisted of the 1956 Emmy Award for Best Continuing Performance by an Actor in a Dramatic Series for his work in the Four Star Playhouse'' series.

Books

Discography

References

Bibliography

External links 

 
 
 
 
 
 
 David Niven on Pathé News

Male actor filmographies
British filmographies